This is a list of the mammal species recorded in Oman. There are at least 62 mammal species in Oman that have been assessed by the International Union for Conservation of Nature (IUCN), of these, one is critically endangered, four are endangered, eight are vulnerable, and two are near threatened.

The following tags are used to highlight each species' conservation status as assessed by the IUCN:

Order: Hyracoidea (hyraxes) 

The hyraxes are any of four species of fairly small, thickset, herbivorous mammals in the order Hyracoidea. About the size of a domestic cat they are well-furred, with rounded bodies and a stumpy tail. They are native to Africa and the Middle East.

Family: Procaviidae (hyraxes)
Genus: Procavia
 Cape hyrax, P. capensis

Order: Sirenia (manatees and dugongs) 

Sirenia is an order of fully aquatic, herbivorous mammals that inhabit rivers, estuaries, coastal marine waters, swamps, and marine wetlands. All four species are endangered.

Family: Dugongidae
Genus: Dugong
Dugong, D. dugon

Order: Rodentia (rodents) 

Rodents make up the largest order of mammals, with over 40% of mammalian species. They have two incisors in the upper and lower jaw which grow continually and must be kept short by gnawing.

Suborder: Sciurognathi
Family: Dipodidae (jerboas)
Subfamily: Dipodinae
Genus: Jaculus
 Lesser Egyptian jerboa, J. jaculus 
Family: Muridae (mice, rats, voles, gerbils, hamsters, etc.)
Subfamily: Deomyinae
Genus: Acomys
 Cairo spiny mouse, Acomys cahirinus LC
 Golden spiny mouse, Acomys russatus LC
Subfamily: Gerbillinae
Genus: Gerbillus
 Cheesman's gerbil, Gerbillus cheesmani LC
 Wagner's gerbil, Gerbillus dasyurus LC
 Pygmy gerbil, Gerbillus henleyi LC
 Balochistan gerbil, Gerbillus nanus LC
Genus: Meriones
 Arabian jird, Meriones arimalius EN
Genus: Hystrix
 Indian crested porcupine, Hystrix indica LC

Order: Erinaceomorpha (hedgehogs and gymnures) 

The order Erinaceomorpha contains a single family, Erinaceidae, which comprise the hedgehogs and gymnures. The hedgehogs are easily recognised by their spines while gymnures look more like large rats.

Family: Erinaceidae (hedgehogs)
Subfamily: Erinaceinae
Genus: Paraechinus
 Desert hedgehog, P. aethiopicus

Order: Soricomorpha (shrews, moles, and solenodons) 

The "shrew-forms" are insectivorous mammals. The shrews and solenodons closely resemble mice while the moles are stout-bodied burrowers.

Family: Soricidae (shrews)
Subfamily: Crocidurinae
Genus: Crocidura
 Arabian shrew, C. arabica LC
 Dhofar shrew, C. dhofarensis DD

Order: Chiroptera (bats) 

The bats' most distinguishing feature is that their forelimbs are developed as wings, making them the only mammals capable of flight. Bat species account for about 20% of all mammals.
Family: Pteropodidae (flying foxes, Old World fruit bats)
Subfamily: Pteropodinae
Genus: Rousettus
 Egyptian fruit bat, Rousettus aegyptiacus LC
Family: Vespertilionidae
Subfamily: Myotinae
Genus: Myotis
 Geoffroy's bat, Myotis emarginatus VU
Subfamily: Vespertilioninae
Genus: Eptesicus
 Botta's serotine, Eptesicus bottae LC
Genus: Hypsugo
 Arabian pipistrelle, Hypsugo arabicus VU
 Bodenheimer's pipistrelle, Hypsugo bodenheimeri LC
Genus: Nyctalus
 Common noctule, Nyctalus noctula LC
Genus: Otonycteris
 Desert long-eared bat, Otonycteris hemprichii LC
Genus: Pipistrellus
 Kuhl's pipistrelle, Pipistrellus kuhlii LC
Genus: Rhyneptesicus
Sind bat, R. nasutus 
Family: Rhinopomatidae
Genus: Rhinopoma
 Egyptian mouse-tailed bat, R. cystops 
 Lesser mouse-tailed bat, Rhinopoma hardwickii LC
 Greater mouse-tailed bat, Rhinopoma microphyllum LC
 Small mouse-tailed bat, Rhinopoma muscatellum LC
Family: Molossidae
Genus: Tadarida
 Egyptian free-tailed bat, Tadarida aegyptiaca LC
Family: Rhinolophidae
Subfamily: Rhinolophinae
Genus: Rhinolophus
Blasius's horseshoe bat, R. blasii 
 Geoffroy's horseshoe bat, Rhinolophus clivosus LC
Subfamily: Hipposiderinae
Genus: Asellia
 Trident leaf-nosed bat, Asellia tridens LC
Genus: Triaenops
 Persian trident bat, Triaenops persicus LC

Order: Cetacea (whales) 

The order Cetacea includes whales, dolphins and porpoises. They are the mammals most fully adapted to aquatic life with a spindle-shaped nearly hairless body, protected by a thick layer of blubber, and forelimbs and tail modified to provide propulsion underwater.

Suborder: Mysticeti
Family: Balaenidae
Family: Balaenopteridae
Subfamily: Balaenopterinae
Genus: Balaenoptera
 Blue whale, Balaenoptera musculus EN
Subfamily: Megapterinae
Genus: Megaptera
Humpback whale, M. novaeangliae 
Suborder: Odontoceti
Superfamily: Platanistoidea
Family: Phocoenidae
Genus: Neophocaena
 Indo-Pacific finless porpoise, Neophocaena phocaenoides DD
Family:Physeteridae
Genus: Physeter
 Sperm whale, Physeter macrocephalus VU
Family: Kogiidae
Genus: Kogia
Pygmy sperm whale, K. breviceps DD
 Dwarf sperm whale, Kogia sima LC
Family: Ziphidae
Subfamily: Hyperoodontinae
Genus: Mesoplodon
 Blainville's beaked whale, Mesoplodon densirostris DD
Family: Delphinidae (marine dolphins)
Genus: Steno
 Rough-toothed dolphin, Steno bredanensis DD
Genus: Sousa
 Indian Ocean humpback dolphin, Sousa plumbea DD
Genus: Tursiops
 Bottlenose dolphin, Tursiops aduncus DD
Genus: Stenella
 Pantropical spotted dolphin, Stenella attenuata LC
 Striped dolphin, Stenella coeruleoalba LC
 Spinner dolphin, Stenella longirostris LC
Genus: Delphinus
 Common dolphin, Delphinus capensis LC
Genus: Lagenodelphis
 Fraser's dolphin, Lagenodelphis hosei DD
Genus: Grampus
 Risso's dolphin, Grampus griseus DD
Genus: Feresa
 Pygmy killer whale, Feresa attenuata DD
Genus: Pseudorca
 False killer whale, Pseudorca crassidens LC
Genus: Orcinus
Orca, O. orca DD

Order: Carnivora (carnivorans) 

There are over 260 species of carnivorans, the majority of which feed primarily on meat. They have a characteristic skull shape and dentition. 
Suborder: Feliformia
Family: Felidae (cats)
Subfamily: Felinae
Genus: Caracal
 Caracal, C. caracal 
Genus: Felis
 African wildcat, F. lybica 
 Sand cat, F. margarita 
Subfamily: Pantherinae
Genus: Panthera
 Leopard, Panthera pardus 
 Arabian leopard, Panthera pardus nimr 
Family: Viverridae
Subfamily: Viverrinae
Genus: Genetta
Common genet, G. genetta 
Family: Herpestidae (mongooses)
Genus: Ichneumia
White-tailed mongoose, I. albacauda  
Family: Hyaenidae (hyaenas)
Genus: Hyaena
Striped hyena, H. hyaena 
Suborder: Caniformia
Family: Canidae (dogs, foxes)
Genus: Vulpes
Blanford's fox, V. cana 
Rüppell's fox, V. rueppellii 
Red fox, V. vulpes 
Genus: Canis
Golden jackal, C. aureus 
Gray wolf, C. lupus 
 Arabian wolf, Canis lupus arabs 
Family: Phocidae (earless seals)
Genus: Mirounga
 Southern elephant seal, M. leonina  vagrant
Family: Mustelidae (mustelids)
Genus: Mellivora
Honey badger, M. capensis

Order: Artiodactyla (even-toed ungulates) 

The even-toed ungulates are ungulates whose weight is borne about equally by the third and fourth toes, rather than mostly or entirely by the third as in perissodactyls. There are about 220 artiodactyl species, including many that are of great economic importance to humans.
Family: Bovidae (cattle, antelope, sheep, goats)
Subfamily: Antilopinae
Genus: Gazella
 Arabian gazelle, G. arabica  
 Arabian sand gazelle, G. marica  
Subfamily: Caprinae
Genus: Arabitragus
 Arabian tahr, A. jayakari 
Genus: Capra
Nubian ibex, C. nubiana 
Genus: Ovis
Urial, O. vignei  presence uncertain, possibly introduced
Oman urial, O. v. arabica
Subfamily: Hippotraginae
Genus: Oryx
 Arabian oryx, O. leucoryx  reintroduced

See also
List of chordate orders
Lists of mammals by region
List of prehistoric mammals
Mammal classification
List of mammals described in the 2000s

References

External links

Lists of mammals by country
Lists of mammals of the Middle East
mammals

mammals